Shagun Chowdhary (born in 1983) is an Indian shooter from Jaipur, Rajasthan. She did her schooling from Maharani Gayatri Devi Girls School, Jaipur and graduated from Jesus and Mary College, Delhi University. Shagun Chowdhary became the first Indian woman to qualify for the Olympics in clay pigeon shooting. She finished in 20th place in the trap shooting event at the 2012 Summer Olympics taking place in London. 

Shagun,a player of ONGC, attributes her success to coach Marcello Dradi and Daniele DiSpigno from Italy and her sports psychologist Vaibhav Agashe. In 2005 Shagun Chowdhary also made a bold move of shifting from double trap to trap. Her father, Sushil Chowdhary, introduced her to Skeet Shooting when she was just 2-years old.

She is the first Indian woman to qualify for the Olympic trap shooting event. In London 2012 with a score of 61 in the qualifying round she stood at the 20th position and was unable to move to the finals.
Shagun Chowdhary has been crowned National Champion multiple times. She won the national championship at the women's trap event at the 61st National Shooting Championship on Thursday 16 November 2017.She is an Asian Games Medalist and the current National Games Champion.

References

Indian female sport shooters
Living people
Sport shooters from Jaipur
Olympic shooters of India
Shooters at the 2012 Summer Olympics
1983 births
Asian Games medalists in shooting
Shooters at the 2010 Asian Games
Shooters at the 2014 Asian Games
Sportswomen from Rajasthan
21st-century Indian women
21st-century Indian people
Asian Games bronze medalists for India
Medalists at the 2014 Asian Games